George Edward (or Edgar) Pugin Meldon (12 September 1875 – 2 July 1950) was an Irish cricketer. He was a right-handed batsman who played four first-class matches for Dublin University in 1895.

His father was physician Austin Meldon. He was appointed surgeon to the Westmoreland Lock Hospital, Dublin in 1904; anaesthetist, Royal City of Dublin Hospital, in 1909; and anaesthetist, Incorporated Dental Hospital of Ireland, in 1909. He died at his home, Dunluce, in Anglesea Road, Dublin on 2 July 1950 and was interred in Glasnevin Cemetery on 4 July 1950, after a Solemn Requiem Mass and funeral conducted by Father A. Camac in the Church of the Sacred Heart, Donnybrook, Dublin. He was survived by three daughters, two sons, and a daughter-in-law.

References

"Irish Medical Obituary" in The Irish Journal of Medical Science (1950), p. 430.
The Irish Times (3 July 1950).
Notes for an obituary compiled by Dr. T. Percy C. Kirkpatrick (Dublin: Royal College of Physicians of Ireland, 1954.)

External links

1875 births
1950 deaths
Irish anaesthetists
Cricketers from Dublin (city)
Irish cricketers
Dublin University cricketers
Medical doctors from Dublin (city)